Europium hydride is the most common hydride of europium with a chemical formula EuH2. In this compound, europium atom is in the +2 oxidation state and the hydrogen atoms are -1. It is a ferromagnetic semiconductor.

Production
Europium hydride can be produced by directly reacting europium and hydrogen gas:
 Eu + H2 → EuH2

Uses
EuH2 can be used as a source of Eu2+ to create metal-organic frameworks that have the Eu2+ ion.

References

Europium(II) compounds
Metal hydrides
Ferromagnetic materials